The T–V distinction (from the Latin pronouns  and ) is a contrast, within one language, between various forms of addressing one's conversation partner or partners. This may be specialized for varying levels of politeness, social distance, courtesy, familiarity, age or insult toward the addressee. The T–V distinction occurs in a number of world's languages.

Germanic

Afrikaans 
Modern Afrikaans rarely makes the distinction between the informal second-person singular / and the more formal  ( when addressing God), with jy supplanting u in most cases. The distinction is sometimes upheld in a formal setting, such as in politics, business or polite conversation. The second-person plural  is used in all social contexts.

Dutch 
However, the formal  started to be used in more and more situations. By the 17th century,  had largely fallen out of use, although it lingered on in some of the more peripheral areas. At this point, the original T–V distinction had been lost, and the original V-pronoun / was used universally for both singular and plural regardless of the type of address. This resembled the state of English today, which has also (outside of dialectal, literary or religious use) lost its original T-pronoun thou.

Around this time, a new formal pronoun  started to come into use. This was also the object form of the subject pronoun /, and how it came to be used as a subject pronoun is not exactly clear. It can be compared to the Spanish , which is a similar contraction of a phrase of indirect address. As in Spanish, the Dutch  was originally conjugated as the third person in verbs, although most verbs had identical second- and third-person singular forms, so that this difference was not apparent for the most part. However,  is now also common.

Around the same time, it became more common to clarify when multiple people were being spoken to, by adding ,  ("people"), or a shortened variety, to the end of the pronoun. It can be compared, in its origin, to the English y'all or Spanish .

In the plural,  is also used, alongside the informal . In the south, only one pronoun, is generally used in all three roles: both singular and plural, formal and informal. U is sometimes also used in formal situations, but the southern  does not have a distinct informal connotation like the northern/standard , and can be used to address anyone without offence. For speakers of the north, this is usually the only place where  is encountered, giving it a formal and archaic tone, even though it is neutral in the southern areas where it is still used.

The pronoun  (unstressed variant of ) can also be used impersonally, corresponding to the English generic you.

In Dutch the formal personal pronoun is used for older people or for people with a higher or equal status, unless the addressed makes it clear they want to be spoken to with the informal pronoun. Unlike for example in German, there is no defined line (in the case of German, roughly when someone passes the age of 16) in which everyone, apart from family, is addressed with the formal pronoun. Addressing parents by  has become very rare;  is often even used to address grandparents. There is also a tendency towards more use of the informal pronoun. Some companies such as IKEA consciously address their customers with the informal . However,  can still be considered more or less obligatory in situations where, for example, a pupil addresses their teacher, people testify in court or communication between a doctor and their patient.

English 

Contemporary English generally uses only the form "you", regardless of level of familiarity.

Old English used  in the second-person singular for both formal and informal contexts.

In Early Modern English superiors and strangers were therefore respectfully addressed as ye in the nominative and you in the objective; thou and thee were used for familiars and subordinates. The more widespread and observed this division became, the more pejorative it became to strangers to be called by the familiar form of address. By the 17th century, such a use among the nobility was strongly and deliberately contemptuous, as in the declamation of the prosecutor at Sir Walter Raleigh's 1603 trial "I thou thee, thou traitor!" Accordingly, the use of thou began to decline and it was effectively extinct in the everyday speech of most English dialects by the early 18th century, supplanted by the polite you, even when addressing children and animals, something also seen in Dutch and Latin America (most of Brazil and parts of Costa Rica and Colombia). Meanwhile, as part of English's continuing development away from its synthetic origins since the influx of French vocabulary following the Norman invasion, you had been replacing ye since the 15th century. Standard English was left with a single second-person pronoun for all cases, numbers and contexts and largely incapable of maintaining a T–V distinction.
Notwithstanding all of this, the translators of the King James Version of the Bible chose to employ the older forms in their work (1604–1611) in order to convey the grammatical distinctions made by their Hebrew, Greek and Latin sources. Its subsequent popularity and the religious rationale of many who continued to employ thou has preserved its use in English, but made it seem pious and ironically more formal and respectful than the everyday you.

In the United States, some Protestant sects, such as the Quakers and Mormons insisted on addressing everyone as thou, because they considered every person to be a friend and an equal. This persisted until the 19th or early 20th century.

Frisian (West) 
In West Frisian, the formal singular nominative  (pronounced yo) is very close to the English you and the Middle and Early Modern English . There is no such distinction in the plural; the plural second person pronoun is always . , a Dutch dialect with strong Frisian influence, parallels this distinction.

West Frisian  is used slightly more often than Dutch . Native speakers of Dutch are sometimes warned against addressing newly acquainted people with  too soon.

German

and  

In German, the formal address  is the same as the third person plural pronoun . Verbs used with this form of address are also identical to third person plural forms. The polite form and its inflected forms are always capitalized in writing, to avoid any ambiguity.

The verbs  and  mean respectively "to address using " and "to address using " and the phrases  or  mean, "to be on  terms". The use of  often coincides with the use of the title plus surname, usage of which is more widespread in German-speaking areas than Anglophone areas. In general terms,  is used to children, animals and God, and between adults (or between adults and children) who are good friends of or related to each other.  is used in other situations, such as in a business situation or where there is no existing relationship. In Internet chats and forums, Germans rarely use , although there are exceptions. In almost all cases it can be considered as impolite to use the "wrong" pronoun, that is a pronoun that is not expected by the other party. However, on the other hand, using an unexpected  can also be a very welcome sign of affection, and using an unexpected  can, in the young, be a very welcome sign of appreciation of the addressed one's maturity.

High school students in Germany are often called  plus given name by their teachers when they enter the —the last 2 or 3 years of high school—around the age of 16.

Children and teenagers are expected to use  when addressing all adults except for family members and family friends whom they have known since early childhood.

For example, it is customary to use  in traditional small pubs and taverns in certain regions (including the Rhineland). Only if the age difference is more than one generation, the younger person might still use .

Being  has also become increasingly common in workplace environments (depending on the line of business and corporate culture to varying degrees), mostly regardless of age. In such environments, the  basis may also be observed as a (sometimes necessary) mark of good social integration within a working group. As a rule of thumb, one might expect to see team colleagues on the workplace level in many industries on a customary  basis with each other, though not always with the group manager and more rarely with higher-ranking managers. As entrants to a team are more closely integrated, this is often marked by making an informal affirmation to that basis or by formally offering it, as a matter of style and habituality. Both the tempo and extent of using the  basis depends much on the culture (and sometimes the climate) of the business, and in some places even more so on that of the particular workgroup itself. The superior, on the other hand, has the right to address the other person informally or formally, which is a personal preference.

Alternatively, one person may use  while they ask the other person if it is acceptable to be addressed informally, and then act accordingly. One accepts the proposal by introducing one's own first name. Should a person later forget that they have adopted , it is polite to remind them by saying,  (We moved on to  terms).

IKEA, for instance, does this to reflect the widespread use of the  form in Sweden (see ).

This custom has also been adopted among the Swiss-French of the Jura, in Poland and Russia (called by its German name, spelled  and  respectively), though the custom in Poland is now slowly disappearing. It was formerly found also in Sweden.

Although the use of  generally coincides with the use of title plus surname, especially in northern and eastern Germany, there is an intermediate address combining  with the first name, whereas in the Berlin region, sometimes  is combined with the surname. The former usage also occurs when addressing teenagers, household staff, or guests of TV or radio programs, while the latter style is usually considered inferior and mainly occurs in working class environments, on schoolyards and in barracks. It may be associated with professional contexts, when colleagues have known one another for a long time, but, e.g. due to differences of status, do not want to switch to the usual  style; or in situations where strangers (e.g. customers) are present for whom it would not be appropriate to learn the first name of the addressee.

When speaking to more than one person in formal situations where one would use  to each one of them separately, Standard German uses . However, in this situation  can often be heard instead, especially in the South of Germany and in Swiss German dialects, and is standard usage for pastors when preaching. If the  standard here is followed, then the usage varies when addressing a group containing both  and  persons: Some speakers use the informal plural , others prefer the formal , and many, concerned that both pronouns might cause offence, prefer to use circumlocutions that avoid either pronoun, for example by expressing an imperative in infinitive form, by applying the passive voice, or using the indefinite pronoun .

Historical predecessors:  and / 
Formerly, the 2nd person plural  ("ye") was used to address social superiors, unless more informal relations had been established. However,  itself shows a degree of informality, and would for example be used in addressing one's father. It is from the latter occurrences that modern  takes its origin;  is the 3rd person plural pronoun. However,  itself is relatively young, and it was rather the formal addresses, often itself singular forms, that took the plural. Even as late as in Dürrenmatt's "The Visit" (written in 1956), an address  ("You do know that, Mr Mayor", modern German would just say ) can be found; Herr Bürgermeister is the formal address and itself a singular term, but  is plural.

Thus, all these go by a similar grammar rule pertaining to the verb used with these addresses as modern .

The forms are still found today in some dialects as a respectful way of addressing elders and are still very often found in works of art and literature (such as books and movies) depicting events at least several centuries in the past, or in a "past-like" fantasy setting, even if modern German is otherwise used in these works; indeed, using the modern  in such a setting would be considered an out-of-place anachronism.  and the 3rd person plural without  are somewhat analogous to the English majestic plural.

The / form is not widely known or understood by the average person any more, whereas  is often still used in dubbed films, especially in medieval/fantasy contexts such as The Lord of the Rings, e.g. "" ("you have entered the Realm of the Lady of the Wood, you can not turn back"). In this context, a historical level is used where the second person plural indicates some nobility of or respect for the addressee, such that from  being used to address a single person, the viewer could mostly, without looking, conclude that the person was of elevated rank such as a king or nobleman, or at least being treated with expressed regard.  would not normally be used to address a peasant (unless he is a prince in disguise or a future prince and the person addressing him has gathered some knowledge or presumption thereof).

Scandinavian languages

Danish 
The German-inspired form  entered Danish in the 18th century, too late to enter liturgical use. In church, as in rural or dialect-speaking areas,  has always been the universal form, especially in Jutland.

As in other Scandinavian languages, even among the prestige dialects, the formal pronoun is waning in use—in the case of Danish, since  ("The Youth Revolts") during and after the protests of 1968. As a general rule, the informal  is accepted everywhere today, except when addressing royalty or during military service. In other contexts, it has come to seem excessively formal and old-fashioned to most Danes. Even at job interviews and among parliamentarians,  has become standard.

In written Danish,  remains current in legal, legislative, and formal business documents, as well as in some translations from other languages. This is sometimes audience-dependent, as in the Danish government's general use of  except in healthcare information directed towards the elderly, where  is still used. Other times, it is maintained as an affectation, as by the staff of some formal restaurants, the  newspaper, TV 2 announcers, and the avowedly conservative Maersk corporation. Attempts by other corporations to avoid sounding either stuffy or too informal by employing circumlocutions—using passive phrasing or using the pronoun  ("one")—have generally proved awkward and been ill-received, and (with the notable exception of the national railway DSB) most have opted for the more personable  form.

Icelandic 
Modern Icelandic is the Scandinavian dialect closest to Old Norse, which made a distinction between the plural  and the dual . This distinction continued in written Icelandic the early 1920 when the plural  was also used on formal occasions. The formal usage of  seems to have pushed the dual  to take over the plural so modern Icelandic normally uses  as a plural.

Norwegian 
In Norwegian, the polite form / and / has more or less disappeared in both spoken and written language. Norwegians now exclusively use , and the polite form does not have a strong cultural pedigree in the country. Until recently,  would sometimes be found in written works, business letters, plays and translations where an impression of formality must be retained.

Norwegians generally refer to one another by first name only, unless the person is better known by full or last name only. This also contributes to the weakening of these pronouns and a general pattern of declining use of polite speech. For example, a student might address their professor by their first name, but would refer to a leading politician by their last name. Norwegian politicians and celebrities are sometimes referred to by their first names, especially in newspaper headlines, while the text of the article most likely would use the person's last name. Nicknames are not very common.

In both forms, when these pronouns are used to indicate politeness, they are always capitalised (to show deference, and separate them from when they indicate, respectively, the third and second person plural).

Swedish 

In Swedish, there has in the last two centuries been a marked difference between usage in Finland Swedish and in Sweden.

In the Swedish of Sweden, the polite  survived from earlier epochs, but had come to be considered somewhat careless, bullying or rude; instead, an intricate system had evolved in order to prudently step around pronouns almost completely. Parts of this system began to erode around the Second World War or so, but the essentials held up into the 1960s.

As the 20th century progressed, Swedish-speakers increasingly came to find this circumlocutive system of addressing, with its innumerable ambiguities and opportunities for unintentional offence, as a nuisance. In the 1960s, the so-called  ('thou-reform') was carried out.

Addressing royalty went somewhat more slowly from a universal  ('Your Majesty'), etc., to that address only on formal occasions, otherwise replaced by third-person (singular if the addressee is single) with title ( 'the King', etc.).

These rules still apply, with marginal exceptions. In order to "alleviate the intrusion" in writing, e.g. in letters or in advertisement, the  can be capitalized. That usage was most widespread in the early days of universal du-address; it has become slightly more common again simultaneously with the partial  revival.

Finland Swedish has undergone a similar development to mainland Swedish since the 1960s, but more slowly and slightly less radically. In Finland one may have to reckon with influence from the Finnish language, still slightly more conservative. In Finland Swedish, the second-person plural form  (noted as formal above) was indeed the traditional respectful address to a single person up to the 1970s or so.

Swedish also has verbs for the addresses:  'to say ', and  'to say '.

Scots 
In Modern Scots the second person singular nominative  (Southern Scots , Shetland dialect ) survived in colloquial speech until the mid 19th century in most of lowland Scotland. It has since been replaced by / in most areas except in Insular Scots where  (Shetland dialect ) is also used, in North Northern Scots and in some Southern Scots varieties.  is used as the familiar form by parents speaking to children, elders to youngsters, or between friends or equals.

Yiddish 
Yiddish makes use of the second person plural form as the polite form for both singular and plural. In the second person plural form , there is therefore no distinction between formal and informal forms. There is a dialectal pronoun  strictly for informal second-person plural form, but this pronoun is rarely used today and is only found in some dialects of Poland and neighboring regions.

Given that medieval German dialects were the main influence on the development of the Yiddish language, this form may be recognized with older polite forms of the German language.

Romance languages

Catalan 

In some dialects,  is no longer used.

The Administration uses  to address people.

French 
In most French-speaking regions (with the exception of Canada, see North American French below), a rigid T–V distinction is upheld. With regard to the second person singular,  is used informally, whereas  is used to convey formality. The second person plural is always . The formal  is expected when encountering any unknown adult under normal circumstances. For instance, some couples have been known to call each other  for some time while dating, and gradually switch to calling each other . The verb  means "address someone with -forms, speak informally"; by contrast  means "address someone with  forms". Rigidly sticking to vous can become equally awkward in a long-standing relationship.

In certain circumstances, however,  is used more broadly. For example, new acquaintances who are conscious of having something socially significant in common (e.g., student status, or the same "rank" in some hierarchy) often use tu more or less immediately. Children and adolescents generally use  to speak with someone of their own age, whether known or not.  can also be used to show disrespect to a stranger, such as when surprising a thief or cursing other drivers on the road.

 may be used to distance oneself from a person with whom one does not want to interact.

In families,  was traditionally used to address older family members. Former president Jacques Chirac and his wife Bernadette are a prominent example of the continuation of this usage.

When praying,  is nowadays often used in addressing the deity, though  was used in Catholic prayers until the Second Vatican Council, and is still used to address the Blessed Virgin Mary. In Louisiana, however,  is always used to convey a sense of respect and reverence when praying.

In Walloon, the use of which tends, in any case, to be restricted mostly to "familiar" contexts,  (equivalent to ) is the general usage and is considered informal and friendly. (equivalent to ), on the other hand, is considered vulgar, and its use can be taken as an expression of an aggressive attitude towards the person addressed. The influence of Standard French, particularly as exercised through the mass media, is eroding this particularity among younger French-speakers.

See below for Italian which has kept this style.

African French 
In , local languages (such as Baoulé, Dioula, etc.) do not make a distinction between informal or formal pronouns, which reflects on the local usage of French. It is thus uncommon to call an individual . A waiter, shop-keeper or taxi driver can very well call a customer , just like an employee towards a superior. For example, an accountant could call her direct branch manager , but will still use  to address the company's CEO.

Relationships between men and women are typically less formal than between people of the same gender (a female supermarket worker will more easily say  towards a male customer than her male colleague).

All those terms of address typically exclude the use of "vous".

Informed local people will still, most of the time, make a conscious effort to use  and / when addressing Westerners in formal situations (unless, again, that Westerner talks Ivorian French rather than Standard French). Other groups of foreigners such as other Africans, Asians or Middle-Eastern people are less likely to enjoy that "privilege".

A switching to  can still happen as soon as the formal event is over (such as managers getting out of the meeting room) or just after having been introduced to each other—usually simultaneous to a switch from Standard French to Ivorian French.

North American French 
North American dialects of French, including Quebec, Acadian and Louisiana French, permit and expect a far broader usage of the familiar  than in European French. There are still circumstances in which it is necessary to say : in a formal interview (notably for a job) or when addressing people of very high rank (such as judges or prime ministers), senior citizens, between professors and students in universities, towards customers or new acquaintances in a formal setting.

For a number of Francophones in Canada,  sounds stilted or snobbish, and archaic.  is by no means restricted to intimates or social inferiors.

Galician 
Galician uses the personal pronouns ti (in Eastern and part of Central Galician, tu) and vós as the singular informal second person and plural informal second person respectively. Formality is expressed by the use of vostede, instead of ti, with the verb conjugated in singular third person form. The plural form is vostedes.

In Galicia, it's common to see instructions and written information, like in museums and bus stops, using the formal pronoun vostede to address the reader. However, it's more likely that a worker and costumer use ti/tu when communicating, or to switch to Spanish with informal pronouns (see Spanish below), than using the formal pronoun vostede.

Italian 
The pronouns may be freely omitted. When  is an object, using feminine adjectives is normal (i.e. "I saw you (m.)"), whereas gender concord is considered non-standard (i.e. "I saw you (m.)).

Presently Italian adults prefer to employ  towards strangers until around 30 years old. It is used reciprocally between adults; the usage may not be reciprocal when young people address older strangers or otherwise respected people.

 is the traditional polite form of address in Tuscan dialects: Dante employs it in his 14th-century Divine Comedy when showing particular respect.  began to replace it during the Renaissance and then, under Spanish influence, it became common to contract obsequious honorifics such as "Your Lordship", "Eminence", and "Majesty", all of which are feminine third-person singular nouns in Italian. Over the next four centuries, all three pronouns—, —were employed together to express degrees of formality and status, as displayed in Manzoni's 19th-century The Betrothed.

Portuguese

Brazilian Portuguese 
("youngster") is used in the same manner by elders when addressing strange youths of both genders.

When addressing an ecclesiastical dignitary the form  ("Your Reverence") is used. Although  is regarded as protocolar, it is an equalizing form.

In some parts of the country and in television speech (that used by reporters and actors, for instance)  is used even between intimate speakers. In other parts of the geographic extension of the language e.g. most of Southern and Northeastern Brazil, some sociolects of coastal São Paulo, mainly in Greater Santos, colloquial  sociolect, mainly among the less educated and some all-class youths of Greater Rio de Janeiro, and in Uruguay, tu (singular "you" or simply "thou") is used informally, but the plural form is always .

It is one of the few dialects in Brazil in which second-person singular agreement is used (along with the relatively conservative dialect of the state of ).

European Portuguese 
Similarly to some Romance languages (e.g. Italian),  or  /  can be omitted because the verb ending provides the necessary information. The second person plural pronoun , from Latin , is archaic in most of the Portuguese-speaking world, but can be heard in liturgy, poetry and has a limited regional use.

Romanian 
The Romanian word  when used for the second-person singular formal takes plural verbs but singular adjectives, similar to French . It is used roughly in the same manner as in Continental French and shows no signs of disappearing. It is also used as a more formal . It originates from  – your lordship. In the past it was used extreme rarely to nobles especially, but its sense extended to other people in the 20th century but not so common and when the communists arrived it took the actual form. As happens with all subject pronouns,  is often omitted from sentences, its use being implied by verbs in the second person plural form.

Older people towards younger people and peers favor . Its use is gradually declining.

The plural form is a recent borrowing. Proto-Romanian and Aromanian, like Classical Latin, do not have the plural form.

Sicilian 
However, due to encroachment by the Italian language  has become increasingly common particularly among younger speakers.

Spanish 

In Peninsular, Mexican, and Peruvian Spanish, as in Italian, an original  and  usage similar to French disappeared in the Early Modern period. Today,  is used for informal and familiar address while the respectful form is the third-person , which can be used respectfully to anyone. In some cases, the title  is also employed when speaking to a respected older man, while  is used for older women.

Among Spanish dialects, the situation is complicated by the fact that the Spanish Empire was created during the middle of this linguistic shift, and geographically remote regions did not participate fully in it. In Costa Rica and part of Colombia,  is used as the common pronoun, using it both in formal and informal situations.

In western Andalucia,  is used in both contexts, but its verbs are conjugated in the second-person plural. Throughout the Americas and the Canaries,  is used in all contexts and in the third person.

In peninsular Spain, the use of usted/ustedes has been diminishing in recent decades and may disappear in the near future. It is seldom used by younger speakers, even when addressing an older person, or in situations that would be considered formal by people one generation their senior.

In Equatoguinean Spanish, tú and Usted are interchangeable.

Judeo-Spanish (Ladino) 

Judeo-Spanish (Ladino), which diverged just as Old Spanish was evolving into modern Spanish, lacks the pronouns usted and ustedes. In most dialects, it uses vos for the second-person formal singular, which takes second-person plural endings. Vozotros/vozotras is used for the second-person plural, whether formal or informal. In some dialects, however, it uses el, eya, and eyos instead of vos and vozotros/vozotras.

Hellenic

Ancient and Hellenistic or Koine Greek 
In Ancient Greek,  was the singular, and  the plural, with no distinction for honorific or familiar.

Modern Greek 
In addition, the informal second person singular is used even with older people you are acquainted with, depending on the level of mutual familiarity.

Since the formal  has become less common outside schools and workplaces, many people often do not know which form to use (because using a formal version might sound too snobbish even to an elder and using the informal version might sound inappropriate to some strangers) and thus prefer to replace verbs with nouns (avoiding the dilemma) until enough information on the counterpart's intentions is gathered in order to choose between formal or informal second person pronoun and verb conjugation. A good rule of thumb is that singular accompanies first names and plural accompanies surnames with title (Mr, Mrs, etc.). Exceptions are rare, for example younger schoolchildren may address their teacher in the plural, title and first name, or an officer may address a soldier in the singular and surname. The sequence singular–title–surname is a faux pas that can often indicate lack of education, of good manners, or of both.

The modern social custom when using Greek in Greece is to ask the other person "may we speak in the singular?" in which the other person is expected to answer "yes" and afterwards the discussion continues using the informal ; it is unthinkable for the other person to answer "no" or show preference for plural forms, and for this reason one should not even ask this question to a person of high status, such as a professional. Therefore, asking this question can itself be considered a form of disrespect in some social situations. Likewise, not asking this question and simply using the singular without prior explicit or implicit agreement would also be considered disrespectful in various social contingencies. In other cases, even using the formal plural (without a question) could also be considered offensive. A person being inappropriately addressed in the singular will often indicate their displeasure by insisting on responding in the plural, in a display of irony that may or may not be evident to the other party. Overall, the distinction between formal and informal forms of address and when to use each can be quite subtle and not easily discernible by a non-native speaker.

Even today, the singular form is used much more frequently in Cyprus compared to Greece, although this is changing under the influence of Standard Modern Greek. The plural form is now expected in a formal setting.

Celtic

Scottish Gaelic 
In Scottish Gaelic, the informal form of the second-person singular is / (emphatic: /), used when addressing a person the speaker knows well, or when addressing a person younger or relatively the same age as the speaker. When addressing a superior, an elder, or a stranger, or in conducting business, the form  is used. ( is also the second person plural).

Irish 
Formerly, Roman Catholic priests were addressed with the plural form , especially in Ulster, due to the possibility that the priest may be carrying the Eucharist on his person—belief in the real presence of Christ in the Eucharist would require the use of the plural.

Welsh, Cornish and Breton 
Modern Welsh, Cornish and Breton all retain a T–V distinction to varying degrees.

 is an alternative to  found in very formal literary language. Alongside the usages explained above, those born before 1945 would, in their youth, use  with a girl of about the same age.

A similar distinction exists between Cornish singular  /  and plural  / . The singular form is used when talking to friends, family, animals and children, and the plural form is used to talk to a group of people, or when being especially polite to one person.

In Breton the second person plural  is used as a polite form when addressing a single person and the singular  is reserved for informal situations.

Balto-Slavic

Belarusian, Russian, and Ukrainian (mainly Eastern) 

East Slavic Languages distinguish between the familiar  and the respectful , the latter also being the plural of both forms. (Respectful  may be capitalised in formal written correspondence, while plural  is not.) The distinction appeared relatively recently and began to gain currency among the educated classes in the 18th century through French influence.

Generally,  is used among friends and relatives, but the usage depends not only on the closeness of the relationship but also on age and the formality of the situation (e.g., work meeting vs. a party). When talking to each other young people often start with the formal  but may transition to  very quickly in an informal situation. Among older people,  is often reserved for closer acquaintances. Use of  without consent of the other person is likely to be viewed as poor conduct or even as an insult (or, in the case of opposite-sexed people, overly flirtatious), particularly if the other party maintains using .

Historically, the rules used to be more class-specific: as late as at the end of the 19th century, it was accepted in some circles (in aristocracy and especially gentry) that  was to be used also between friends, between husband and wife, and when addressing one's parents (but not one's children), all of which situations today would strongly call for using . Meanwhile, up to this day, common people, especially those living in rural areas, hardly ever use the polite . Russian and Belarusian speakers online uphold the distinction and mainly use  for strangers, although in the earlier days of internet it was more common and expected to use  to address everyone.

Normally,  is associated with the informal addressing by first name only (or, even more informally, by the patronymic only), whereas  is associated with the more formal addressing format of using the first name together with patronymics (roughly analogous to "title followed by last name" in English) or the last name together with a title (the last name is almost never used together with either of the other two names to address someone, although such combinations are routinely used to introduce or mention someone). However, nowadays,  can also be employed while addressing by first name only.

In Ukrainian, the present practice is essentially the same as in Russian, historically this was primarily in the Eastern, Russian-ruled part of Ukraine. Until about 1945, due to Polish influence, the practices in the former Galicia and Volyn regions, tended to more closely resemble the Polish practices, as described below.

Serbo-Croatian 
In all standard forms of Serbo-Croatian, i.e. In any formal use, the second-person plural, is used only;  can be used among peers in a workplace but is rare in official documents. 

With the polite , masculine plural (in participles and adjectives) is used regardless of the sex of the person addressed.

Bulgarian 
Bulgarian distinguishes between familiar  and respectful .  is always singular and implies familiarity.

In addressing more than one person, the plural  is always used. For example, " means "You two leave, please!"). Here, although  and  both means you,  can not be used.

When addressing a single person, if the people talking are acquainted then singular  is used, otherwise plural  should be used. Sometimes people start a new acquaintance straightforwardly with singular , but generally this is considered offensive, rude, or simply impolite. Children are taught to always use  between themselves, but  for addressing more than one child or an unknown adult.

The grammatically correct spelling of the singular word  is always with a capital letter, whether being the first word in a sentence or not. For example, the sentence "But you are wrong!", if spelled (in Bulgarian)  (the word  with capital ), it would convey that the speaker is addressing an individual person with a plural, because he/she wants to express a polite, official manner; if spelt  (the second possible Bulgarian translation of "But you are wrong!"), it would then mean that someone is talking to several persons.

Generally,  is used among friends and relatives. There is a recent trend not to use the formal  at all, but this can lead to awkward situations.

Macedonian 
Macedonian distinguishes between familiar  and respectful —which is also the plural of both forms, used to address a pair or group. (Respectful  may be capitalized, while plural  is not.) Generally,  is used among friends and relatives, but the usage depends not only on the closeness of the relationship but also on age and the formality of the situation (e.g., work meeting vs. a party). When talking to each other young people often start with the formal , but may transit to  very quickly in an informal situation. Among older people,  is often reserved for closer acquaintances. Use of  without consent of the other person is likely to be viewed as poor conduct or even as an insult, particularly if the other party maintains using .

Polish 

Because of their character as nouns (and not pronouns) these words are used with the third person: For example, the familiar  ("You want to drink") becomes  (literally "The gentleman wants to drink").

Further,  and  can be combined with the first name, the last name and with titles like "President", "Professor", "Doctor", "Editor" and others (etc.; using these titles is considered necessary); using both is considered more polite or, in some context, even submissive. Addressing a present person with the last name is only usual in court or in other affairs, where government authority is involved, and generally considered impolite or condescending. When addressing someone, all these forms always require the vocative case, which is otherwise optional (for example  ("Mr Kowalski!"),  ("Mrs Joanna!"),  ("Professor!")).

Plural  is also used as V-form in dialects, for example  ("Mother, what are you eating?"). Following its Russian usage, the plural V-form was also promoted in the Polish language from 1945, becoming associated with Communist ideology and addressing of a person by a government or Party official.

Besides, other forms can be sometimes used like  in third person when talking to older family members ("May mother say"), to clergy ("Yes, priest got it right") or to other people in less formal or semi-formal situations, e.g. polite quarrel or dispute ("Also, may my dear friend please learn more and only then instruct others").

Slovene 

In Slovenian, although informal address using the second person singular  form (known as ) is officially limited to friends and family, talk among children, and addressing animals, it is increasingly used instead of its polite or formal counterpart using the second person plural  form (known as ).

There is an additional nonstandard but widespread use of a singular participle combined with a plural auxiliary verb (known as ) that also reveals the gender of the person and is used in somewhat less formal situations:

  ('You did not see him': both the auxiliary verb  and the participle  are plural masculine.)
  ('You did not see him': the auxiliary verb  is plural but the participle  is singular masculine/feminine.)

Gender can also change. In  and  forms, all words referring to the subject are in masculine forms, in  this is only limited to pronouns. In , all words referring to the subject are in neuter forms.

Czech 

In Czech, there are three levels of formality. The most formal is using the second person plural verb forms (V form) with the surname or title of the addressed person, usual between strangers or people in a professional relationship. The second common form is made by using the second person singular verb forms (T form) together with the given name of the other person, used between friends and in certain social groups (students etc.). The third form, which is rather less common, is using the V form in combination with the given name. It may be used by a teacher when addressing a student (especially at the secondary school level), by a boss addressing their secretary, or in other relationships where a certain degree of familiarity has developed, but has not superseded some level of mutually acknowledged respect or distance. This form of address is usually asymmetrical (the perceived social superior uses V form in combination with the first name, the perceived social inferior using V form and the surname or honorific), less often symmetrical. Using the singular verb forms together with the surname or title is considered very rude. Where a stranger introduces themself with title (like), it is considered more polite to address them using the V form in combination with their title (always preceded by the honorific /, i.e. Mr/Ms), rather than their surname. However, it is considered poor manners to address somebody with their title in combination with the T form.

Traditionally, use of the informal form was limited for relatives, very close friends, and for children. During the second half of the 20th century, use of the informal form grew significantly among coworkers, youth and members of organisations and groups. The formal form is always used in official documents and when dealing with a stranger (especially an older one) as a sign of respect. 2nd-person pronouns are often capitalized in letters, advertisement, etc. The capitalization is optional and is slowly becoming obsolete. The V verbs always end with te. A variant of the formal form modeled after German  (/, /, verb ) was frequently used during the 19th century but has since disappeared. This form is also associated with the Czech Jewish community before Second World War, and still appears very often in Jewish humour as sign of local colour. Sometimes it is used as irony.

In the Internet age, where people communicate under nicknames or pseudonymes and almost solely in an informal way, capitalizing (/) is used to emphasise respect, or simply presence of respect. ( = friends, honored acquaintance, strangers  = basic form, / = most formal, used to create distance or express contempt, very rude if not sufficiently advocated, often used as insult itself). 

In grammar, plural forms are used in personal and possessive pronouns ( – you,  – your) and in verbs, but not in participles and adjectives, they are used in singular forms (when addressing a single person). This differs from some other Slavic languages (Slovak, Russian, etc.)

Greetings are also connected with T–V distinction.

Lithuanian 
This form was used to communicate with a stranger who has not earned particular respect (a beggar, for example). Modern Lithuanian Dictionary describes  as a polite form of second singular person , making its meaning somewhere in the middle between informal  and formal .

Indic

Hindi and Urdu 
In the standard forms of both Hindi and Urdu there are three levels of honorifics:
    : The formal V-form used to address another person. Used with third-person verbs or separate honorific verb forms in all formal settings and when speaking to persons who are senior in age or social hierarchy. No difference between the singular and the plural; plural reference can, however, be indicated by the use of "you people" or "you all". This form is, however, strictly dialectal and not considered standard in Hindi and Urdu. Aap should always be used for strangers, and especially in Urdu, is the preferred pronoun for normal conversation.
    : Originally, a plural pronoun ("you"), it is nowadays used as singular V-form in all informal settings and when speaking to persons who are junior in age or social hierarchy. No difference between the singular and the plural; plural reference can, however, be indicated by the use of "you people" or "you all".
    : Originally, a singular pronoun ("thou"), it is nowadays used exclusively as a T-form, in extremely informal settings: to address own children, very close friends, or in poetic language (either with God or with lovers). When used to others (e.g., strangers), it is considered offensive both in Pakistan and India. For Urdu in particular,  is considered extremely rude in normal conversation, and is reserved for poetry; some Urdu speakers use this to refer to God.

Punjabi 

 ਤੁਸੀਂ/- Just like the Hindustani आप/ it is used in formal contexts for a person higher in social hierarchy
 ਤੂੰ/- Punjabi lacks a तुम-/तू- distinction. The speaker must decide whether to use ਤੁਸੀਂ/ or ਤੂੰ/ with a person. While तुम- is not considered offensive in most informal social interactions, in Punjabi तुम- doesn't exist so usually ਤੂੰ/ is considered inappropriate for a person higher in social hierarchy and ਤੁਸੀਂ/ is used. ਤੁਸੀਂ/ is also used with strangers.

Bengali 
These two pronouns are also typically used when speaking to children, or to younger members of the extended family.   is also used when addressing God. This is also true in advertisements and public announcements. It is also used when addressing people presumed to be of "inferior" social status; this latter use is occasionally used when speaking to housemaids, rickshaw-pullers, and other service workers, although this use is considered offensive.

The situations in which these different pronouns can be used vary considerably depending on many social factors.

Finno-Ugric

Finnish 
In Finnish, today the use of the informal singular form of address is widespread in all social circles, even among strangers and in business situations. The use of formal address has not disappeared however, and persists in situations involving customer service (especially if the customer is clearly older than the person serving them) and in general in addressing the elderly or in situations where strict adherence to form is expected, such as in the military. An increase in the use of formal address has been reported in recent years, whereby some people are choosing to use the formal form more often.. As the use of the form conveys formal recognition of the addressee's status and, more correctly, of polite social distance, the formal form might also occasionally be used jeeringly or to protest the addressee's snobbery. A native speaker may also switch to formal form when speaking in anger, as an attempt to remain civil. Advertisements, instructions and other formal messages are mostly in informal singular form ( and its conjugations), but the use of formal forms has increased in recent years. For example, as the tax authorities tend to become more informal, in contrast the social security system is reverting to using the formal form.

The same forms, such as the pronoun , are used for formal singular and for both formal and informal plural.

Almost all of these elements follow the grammar of the second person plural also in the formal singular form. For example, polite  vs. informal , "Could you move your car, (please)?".

As a few examples of this could be mentioned the way imperatives are expressed:  "Go!" (plural), vs.  "Go!" (singular), and the usage of the plural suffix  "your" instead of the singular  "your".

There is number agreement in Finnish, thus you say  "you are" (singular), but  "you are" (plural). However, this does not extend to words describing the addressee, which are in the singular, e.g.  "are you doctor?" (plural, plural, singular)

A common error, nowadays often made even by native speakers unused to the formal forms, is to use the plural form of the main verb in the perfect and pluperfect constructions. The main verb should be in the singular when addressing one person in the formal plural:  instead of  "Have you heard?"

Sometimes the third person is used as a polite form of address, after the Swedish model:  "What would madam like to have?" This is far less common in the Eastern parts of Finland, influenced less by the Swedish language and all in all a declining habit. The passive voice may be used to circumvent the choice of the correct form of address. In another meaning, the passive voice is also the equivalent of the English patronizing we as in  "How are we feeling today?"

In the Bible and in the Kalevala, only the "informal" singular is used in all cases.

Estonian 
Estonian is a language with T–V distinction, second person plural is used instead of second person singular as a means of expressing politeness or formal speech.  is the familiar form of address used with family, friends, and minors. The distinction is still much more widely used and more rigid than in closely related Finnish language.

In hierarchical organizations, like large businesses or armies,  is used between members of a same rank/level while  is used between members of different ranks. (the verb  is also used) is used with relatives, friends, when addressing children and with close colleagues. Borderline situations, such as distant relatives, young adults, customers in rental shops or new colleagues, sometimes still present difficulties.

Hungarian 
Hungarian provides numerous, often subtle means of T–V distinction:

The use of the second-person conjugation with the pronoun  (plural ) is the most informal mode. As in many other European languages, it is used within families, among children, lovers, close friends, (nowadays often) among coworkers, and in some communities, suggesting an idea of brotherhood. Adults unilaterally address children this way, and it is the form used in addressing God and other Christian figures (such as Jesus Christ or the Blessed Virgin), animals, and objects or ideas. Sociologically, the use of this form is widening. Brüderschaft (trinken) in German), today people under the age of about thirty will often mutually adopt  automatically in informal situations. A notable example is the Internet: strangers meeting online often use the informal forms of address, regardless of age or status differences. 

Nevertheless, formal forms of address are alive and well in Hungarian:
 The third-person verb conjugation is the primary basis of formal address. The choice of which pronoun to use, however, is fraught with difficulty (and indeed a common solution when in doubt is to simply avoid using any pronoun at all, using the addressee's name or title instead). 
 The pronoun  (plural ), for instance, is considered the basic formal equivalent of "you", but may not be used indiscriminately, as it tends to imply an existing or desired personal acquaintance. (It would not, for instance, ordinarily be used in a conversation where the relative social roles are predominantly important—say, between professor and student.) Typical situations where  might be used are, e.g., distant relatives, neighbours, fellow travellers on the train, or at the hairdresser's. If one already knows these people, they may even take offence if one were to address them more formally. On the other hand, some urbanites tend to avoid , finding it too rural, old-fashioned, offensive or even intimate. Note that  coincides with the reflexive pronoun (cf. him/herself), so e.g. the sentence  can have three meanings: "Did he hit himself?", "Did he hit you?" or "Did you hit yourself?".
  (plural ) is the formal, official and impersonal "you". It is the form used when people take part in a situation merely as representatives of social roles, where personal acquaintance is not a factor. It is thus used in institutions, business, bureaucracy, advertisements, by broadcasters, by shopkeepers to their customers, and whenever one wishes to maintain one's distance. It is less typical of rural areas or small towns, more typical of cities. It's often capitalized in letters.
 Other pronouns are nowadays rare, restricted to rural, jocular, dialect, or old-fashioned speech.
 There is a wide spectrum of third-person address that avoids the above pronouns entirely; preferring to substitute various combinations of the addressee's names and/or titles. Thus, for instance, a university student might ask  ("What does Professor X. think?", meant for the addressee) rather than using the insufficiently formal  or the overly impersonal . If the difference in rank is not to be emphasized, it is perfectly acceptable to use the addressed person's first name instead of a second-person pronoun, e.g.  ("I'd like to ask [you,] Peter to…"). (Note that these are possible because the formal second-person conjugation of verbs is the same as the third-person conjugation.)
 Finally, the auxiliary verb  (lit. "it pleases [you]") is an indirect alternative (or, perhaps, supplement) to direct address with the third or even second person. It is very polite (sometimes seen as over-polite) and not as formal as the  form. Children usually address adults outside their family this way. Adults may address more distant relatives, housekeepers and older persons using this form, and some men habitually address older or younger women this way (this is slightly old-fashioned).

It is important to keep in mind that formal conjugation doesn't automatically imply politeness or vice versa; these factors are independent of each other. For example,  "What would you like to have?" (literally, "What do you command?") is in the informal conjugation, while it can be extremely polite, making it possible to express one's honour towards people one has previously established a friendly relationship with. On the other hand,  "What do you want?" is expressed with the formal conjugation, nevertheless it may sound rude and aggressive; the formal conjugation does not soften this tone in any way.

*  is a form of addressing for professors (cf. "Sir");  is the accusative.
**  is an example name in the accusative (cf. "Aunt Mary").

Turkic

Turkish 
In modern Turkish, the T–V distinction is strong. Family members and friends speak to one another using the second-person singular , and adults use  to address minors. In formal situations (business, customer–clerk, and colleague relationships, or meeting people for the first time) the plural second-person  is used almost exclusively. In very formal situations, the double plural second-person  may be used to address a much-respected person. Rarely, the third-person plural form of the verb (but not the pronoun) may be used to emphasize utmost respect. Additionally, if there are two or more person  or  could be used. For example,  or  have same meaning that "You have been chosen". However,  are not certain whether plural or singular. It changes; formal speaking  specifies one person or more but informal speaking it specifies only two or more person. The very formal forms are not frequently used in spoken Turkish, but is pretty common in written directives, such as manuals and warning signs.

Uyghur 
Uyghur is notable for using four different forms, to distinguish both singular and plural in both formal and informal registers. In Old Turkic, as still in modern Turkish,  was the original second-person plural. However, in modern Uyghur  has become restricted to the formal singular, requiring the plural suffix  for the plurals.

 as the formal singular pronoun is characteristic of the Ürümqi dialect, which is the Uyghur literary standard.

Northwest Caucasian

Ubykh 
In the extinct Ubykh language, the T–V distinction was most notable between a man and his mother-in-law, where the plural form  supplanted the singular  very frequently, possibly under the influence of Turkish. The distinction was upheld less frequently in other relationships, but did still occur.

Semitic

Arabic 
Modern Standard Arabic uses the majestic plural form of the second person in respectful address. It is restricted to highly formal contexts, generally relating to politics and government. However, several varieties of Arabic have a clearer T–V distinction. Finally, the "V" term is used only with social superiors (including elders); unfamiliar people perceived to be of similar or lower social standing to the speaker are addressed with the T term .

Hebrew 
In modern Hebrew, there is a T–V distinction used in a set of very formal occasions, for example, a lawyer addressing a judge, or when speaking to rabbis.

The formal form of address when speaking to a person of higher authority is the third person singular using the person's title without the use of the pronoun. Thus, a rabbi could be asked:  ("would the honorable rabbi like to eat?") or a judge told:  ("his honour is considering my request").

Other persons of authority are normally addressed by their title only, rather than by name, using the second person singular.

In non-Hebrew-speaking Jewish culture, the second-person form of address is similarly avoided in cases of higher authority (e.g., a student in a yeshiva would be far more likely to say in a classroom discussion "yesterday the Rav told us..." than "yesterday you told us..."). However, this usage is limited to more conservative (i.e. Orthodox) circles.

Dravidian

Tamil 
In Tamil, the second-person singular pronoun நீ  and its derived forms are used to address children, (younger or very close) members of the family and to people who are younger than the speaker. The second person plural pronoun நீங்கள்  is used to address elders (also within the extended family), teachers, people who are older than the speaker and anyone whom the speaker does not personally know, especially in formal situations.

However, in Sri Lankan Tamil dialects, the second person plural pronoun நீங்கள்  is used in colloquial situations as well.

Sino-Tibetan

Chinese 

Chinese culture has taken naming and forms of address very seriously, strictly regulating which people were permitted to use which terms in conversation or in writing. The extreme example is the 1777 execution of Wang Xihou and his entire family and the confiscation of their entire estate as his penalty for writing the Qianlong Emperor's personal name as part of a criticism of the Kangxi Dictionary. Many honorifics and niceties of address fell by the wayside during the Cultural Revolution of the late 1960s amid Mao Zedong's campaign against the "Four Olds". This included an attempt to eradicate expressions of deference to teachers and to others seen as preserving "counter-revolutionary" modes of thought. The defeat of the Maoist Gang of Four in the late 1970s and continuing reforms since the 1980s has, however, permitted a return of such traditional and regional expressions.

Historically, the T–V distinction was observed among the Chinese by avoiding any use of common pronouns in addressing a respected audience. Instead, third-person honorifics and respectful titles were employed. One aspect of such respectful address was avoiding the use of the first-person pronoun as well, instead choosing a (typically humble) epithet in its place. The extreme of this practice occurred when Shi Huangdi abrogated the then-current first-person pronoun  (zhèn); the present first-person pronoun  (wǒ) subsequently developed out of the habit of referring to "this [worthless] body", the character's original meaning. An important difference between the T–V distinction in Chinese compared with modern European languages is that Chinese culture considers the relative age of the speakers an important aspect of their social distance. This is especially strong within families: while the speakers of European languages may generally prefer forms of address such as "father" or "grandpa", Chinese speakers consider using the personal names of elders such a taboo that they may not even know the given names of grandparents who live in the same apartment. While strictures against writing the personal name of any ancestor of the last seven generations are no longer observed, it remains very uncommon to name children for any living relative: younger people using the name freely would disrespect the original bearer.

Much like European languages, the honorific form developed out of an earlier second-person plural: during the Jin and Yuan dynasties, the Mandarin dialects mutated  (nǐměi) into  (nǐmen) and then into . (A similar form  , tān  developed for the third-person singular but is now generally unused. While unseen elsewhere, some Beijing dialects use a further wǎnmen for the first-person plural to include a person worthy of respect, where wǎn is from  wǒmen.)

It is worth noting that the T–V distinction in Mandarin does not connote a distance or lack of intimacy between the speakers (as implied, e.g., in the French vous). On the contrary, it is often noted that the respectful form contains the radical for "heart" (xīn); although this is actually for phonetic reasons, the implication is that the addressee is loved and cherished by the speaker.

Most southern dialects, however, do not make this distinction in speech at all. Cantonese and Shanghainese speakers learn to write both forms in school but pronounce them identically: the Cantonese as nei5 and the Shanghainese as nóng. Formality is still respected, but their languages  like Japanese and Vietnamese  retain the earlier Chinese tradition of employing epithets or honorifics instead of using any pronouns at all when showing formal respect.

Japonic

Japanese 

Under heavy Chinese influence, traditional Japanese culture eschewed the use of common pronouns in formal speech; similarly, the Chinese first-person singular  (chin) was arrogated to the personal use of the emperor. The formality of Japanese culture was such that its original pronouns have largely ceased to be used at all. Some linguists therefore argue that Japanese lacks any pronouns whatsoever, but  although it is a larger and more complex group of words than most languages employ  Japanese pronouns do exist, having developed out of the most common epithets used to express different relationships and relative degrees of social status. As in Korean, polite language encompasses not only these specific pronouns but also suffixes and vocabulary as well.

"dear one") is the most common polite equivalent, but is also commonly used by women towards an intimate as a term of endearment. The pronoun  (kisama) is illustrative of the complexity that can be involved, though, in that its literal meaning is quite flattering  lit. "dear and honorable sir"  but its ironic use has made it a strong insult in modern Japanese. Similarly,  (omae)  lit. "(one who is) before (me)"  was traditionally a respectful pronoun used toward aristocrats and religious figureheads, but today is considered very informal and impolite, yet also commonly used by husbands towards their wives in an endearing manner.

Austro-Asiatic

Vietnamese 

Under heavy Chinese influence, Vietnamese culture has eschewed the use of common pronouns in formal speech; similarly, the Chinese first-person singular  (Vietnamese: trẫm) was arrogated to the personal use of the emperor.

In modern Vietnamese, only the first-person singular tôi is in common use as a respectful pronoun; any other pronoun should be replaced with the subject's name or with an appropriate epithet, title, or relationship in polite formal speech. Similar to modern Chinese (but to a much greater extent), modern Vietnamese also frequently replaces informal pronouns with kinship terms in many situations. The somewhat insulting second-person singular mày is also frequently used in informal situations among young Vietnamese.

Kra–Dai languages

Thai 
In Thai, first, second, and third person pronouns vary in formality according to the social standing of the speaker and the referent and the relationship between them.

Austronesian

Indonesian 
In Indonesian, the T–V distinction is extremely important; addressing a stranger with the pronoun kau or kamu (you) is considered rude and impolite (unless the stranger is, for example, a child). When addressing a stranger or someone older, typically Bu ('ma'am') or Pak ('sir') is used. People also use mas (Javanese for 'older brother') or mbak (Javanese for 'older sister') when addressing someone that is not old enough to be called Bu or Pak. There are variations in different areas. If the situation is more formal, such as in meetings or news broadcasting, Anda is always used, even if those addressed would otherwise be addressed by kau or kamu in informal situations. 
A more informal pronoun, written lu, lo, or sometimes as loe (originated from Hokkien language) is considered very impolite. This is normally used around the capital Jakarta, as in other areas the use of loe is still perceived as rather unusual or as an attempt to imitate Jakartans. Loe is generally used by teenagers to their peers. Adults can sometimes be heard using this pronoun with their close friends or when they are angry.

 Lu siap? ('Are you ready?'): This form is used between friends in very informal situations without the presence of someone who has higher status.
 Kamu siap? ('Are you ready?'): This form is used between friends in either informal or formal situations without the presence of someone who has higher status.
 Anda siap? ('Are you ready?'): This form is used between friends in formal situations, between business partners, or with someone who has higher status.
 Apakah Anda siap? (Are you ready?): This form is used between friends in very formal situations, among strangers, or toward someone who has higher status. Note that Apakah is an optional question word that is used in close-ended questions (similar to the use of 'to be' and other auxiliary verbs to form close-ended questions in English). This is a form of Bahasa Baku, i.e. formal standard language.

Similarly, kalian and Anda/Anda sekalian are used.

It's worth noting that the pronoun kamu in Indonesian was originally used for plural, but has shifted to be used in singular today. The modern form of plural you is kalian, which is a shortened form of "kamu sekalian" (sekalian meaning 'all at once').
This mirrors the development of the use of you in English, which replaced thee/thou, and in which certain modern varieties developed a form for second person plural, notable examples would be y'all, you guys, and youse.
Unlike in English, where thee/thou is no longer used, in Indonesian the original pronoun for singular, kau or engkau, isn't completely supplanted by kamu. 
This is similar to the situation in some Latin American countries, where tu and vos (originally plural. cf. tu vs voi/vous in Romanian, Italian and French.) exist side by side.

Tagalog 
In Tagalog, the familiar second person is ikáw/ka (in the nominative case). This is replaced by kayó (which is actually the second person plural) when the situation calls for a more polite tone. The pronoun kayó is accompanied by the particle pô. This form is generally used to show respect to close, older relatives. This is also the form expected when talking with the peers of parents or grandparents.

Traditionally, when a higher degree of formality is required, the third person plural (silá) is used instead. It is used when addressing people of higher social rank, such as government officials and senior clergymen. It may also be used when speaking to complete strangers as a matter of courtesy, such as when answering the door or an unknown caller.

 Sino ka? (Who are you?) [Used to ask for the identity of a peer or one of equal social rank, such as a student to a fellow student. Depending on intonation, this question may sound impolite.]
 Sino pô kayó? (Who are you?) [This form implies that the speaker believes the person addressed is a relative or an individual of a higher rank, and is thus used to confirm the relationship.]
 Sino pô silá? (Who are you, Sir/Ma'am?) [Though 'pô' does not really translate as 'Sir' or 'Ma'am', this form implies that the person being addressed is a complete stranger and the speaker has no idea who they are.]

Younger Filipinos tend to mix these forms of address, resulting in questions such as Sino ka pô ba? in an attempt to sound polite towards a total stranger. This and other nonstandard variants are very widespread, especially in the Manila dialect of Tagalog and its surrounding suburbs.

Other languages

Basque 

Basque has two levels of formality in every dialect, which are hi and zu, but in some areas of Gipuzkoa and Biscay, the respectful form berori is still used by some speakers, just as the familiar xu in some areas of the Eastern Low Navarrese dialect, when addressing children and close friends. Most speakers only use the zu form (zuka level) and that is the usual one used in methods, slogans... although the hi form (hika) is very common in villages.

The neutral or formal one is zu, which originally used to be the plural form of the second person. The informal one is hi, whose use is limited to some specific situations: among close friends, to children (children never use it when addressing their parents, neither the spouses among them), when talking to a younger person, to animals (cattle, pets...), in monologues, and when speaking angrily to somebody. Their common plural form is zuek, whenever the speaker is talking to a group of listeners who would all be individually addressed with the form zu, or the form hi, or both (a conversation where some listeners are addressed as zu—i.e., somebody's parents, for instance—and others as hi—the speaker's siblings).

Unlike zu, hi sometimes makes a distinction whether the addressed one is a male or a female. For example: duk (thou, male, hast) and dun (thou, female, hast). The use of the hika level requires the allocutive agreement (hitano or zeharkako hika, i.e., indirect hika) in non-subordinate sentences to mark this distinction for the first and third person verbs. Those allocutive forms are found in the indicative and conditional moods, but never in the subjunctive and imperative moods, with the one exception of goazemak (let's go, said to a male) and goazeman (said to a female) in Western dialects, opposed to goazen, the neutral form. For example:

 du (neutral, s/he has, neutral form), dik (s/he has, male thou) and din (s/he has, female thou), as in aitak ikasi du (polite: Dad has learned it), aitak ikasi dik (informal, said to a male), and aitak ikasi din (informal, said to a female).
 dio (neutral, s/he has it for him / her), ziok (familiar, s/he has it for him / her, said to a male), and zion (familiar, s/he has it for him / her, said to a female), as in aitak erosi dio (polite: Dad has bought it for him / her), aitak erosi ziok (informal, said to a male), and aitak erosi zion (informal, said to a female).
 nintzen (neutral, I was), ninduan (familiar, said to a male), and nindunan (familiar, said to a female), as in hona etorri nintzen (polite: I came here), hona etorri ninduan (informal, said to a male), and hona etorri nindunan (informal, said to a female).

Nevertheless, if any of the allocutive sentences becomes subordinate, the formal one is used: aitak ikasi duelako (because dad has learned it), aitak erosi diolako (because dad bought it for him / her), and hona etorri nintzenean (when I came here).

On the other hand, in past tense verbal forms, no distinction is made when the addressee is the subject or the direct object in the sentence. For example:

 hintzen, in etxera joan hintzen (thou wentst home),
 huen, in filma ikusi huen (thou sawst the film),
 hindugun, in ikusi hindugun (we saw thee).

But if the familiar second-person appears in the verb, or if the verb is an allocutive form in a non-dependent clause, the masculine and feminine forms differ. For example:

 genian / geninan (we had something for thee, male / female): hiri eman genian, Piarres (we gave it to thee, Peter), and hiri eman geninan, Maddi (we gave it to thee, Mary).
 geniean / genienan (male allocutive / female allocutive, we had something for them): haiei eman geniean, Piarres (we gave it to them, Peter), and haiei eman genienan, Maddi (we gave it to them, Mary). Their corresponding neutral form is haiei eman genien.
 banekian erantzuna (I knew the answer, said to a male), and banekinan erantzuna (I knew the answer, said to a female). Their corresponding neutral form is banekien erantzuna.

The friendly xu form or xuketa resembles the zuka forms of the verbs, and includes another kind of allocutive, as hika: cf. egia erran dut (formal: I told the truth), egia erran diat (informal, said to a male), egia erran dinat (informal, said to a female), egia erran dautzut (in formal Eastern Low Navarrese, I told you the truth) and egia erran dixut (xuketa). It is mainly used among relatives and close friends.

The berori form or berorika is very formal, and hardly used nowadays, mainly in some areas of Biscay and Gipuzkoa, to address priests, the elderly, judges and the nobility. Verbs are inflected in their singular third form, like in Italian ((Lei) è molto gentile, opposed to (tu) sei molto gentile, you are very nice / thou art very nice) or the Spanish (usted) es muy amable, opposed to (tú) eres muy amable:

 neutral: zuk badakizu hori (you know it, formal), and zu, eser zaitez hemen (you, sit here),
 familiar: hik badakik hori (thou knowest that, said to a male), hik badakin hori (to a female), and hi, eser hadi hemen (sit here, for both genders),
 very formal: berorrek badaki hori (you know that: cf. hark badaki hori, s/he knows that, neutral), and berori, eser bedi hemen (you, sit down here: cf hura, eser bedi hemen, let him sit down here).

Unlike the hika level, berorika has no allocutive forms.

The extinct dialect of Erronkari or Roncal, spoken in the easternmost area of Navarre, presented a four-levelled system:

 neutral or zuketza, the local equivalent of zuka: etxeara xuan zra (you went home, you have gone home), etxeara xuan naz (I went home, I have gone home),
 informal or yiketza, which corresponds to hika: etxeara xuan yaz, (thou wentst home, thou hast gone home), etxeara xuan nuk / etxeara xuan nun (I went home, I have been home, said to a male / to a female),
 familiar or tzuketza, like the Eastern Navarrese xuka: etxeara xuan nuzu (I went home, I have been home),
 and orika, duka or duketza, the local form of berorika: ori etxeara xin da (you went home, you have been home).

Constructed languages

Esperanto 
Esperanto is a T–V-distinguishing language, but usually vi is used for both singular and plural, just like you in modern English. An informal second person singular pronoun, ci, indeed exists, but it is seldom used in practice. It is intended mainly to make the familiar/respectful distinction when translating (literature, for example) from languages with the T–V distinction.

Some have imagined ci as an archaic term that was used before and then fell out of common usage; however, this is not true. It has appeared only sometimes in experimental language. In standard Esperanto, vi is always used since the beginning. For example, ci appears in neither the Fundamenta Gramatiko nor the Unua Libro. But, especially in some circles, people have begun to use ci in practical language, mainly as the familiar and intimate singular, reserving vi for the plural and formal singular. Others use ci as singular and vi as plural regardless of formality.

Ido 
In Ido, in theory tu is limited to friends and family, whereas vu is used anywhere else. However, many users actually adapt the practice in their own mother tongue and use tu and vu accordingly. In the plural, though, the only form in use is vi, which does not distinguish between formal and informal address.

In all cases, an -n is added to the original pronoun to indicate a direct object that precedes its own verb: Me amoras tu (I love you) becomes Tun me amoras if the direct object takes the first place, for example for emphatic purposes.

Tolkien's High Elvish 
In High Elvish, self-named Quenya, there is a distinction between singular informal tyë and singular formal lyë. The plural of both forms is lë. The formal form is expected between all but family members and close friends. The appendices to The Lord of the Rings state that Westron followed a similar pattern, although the dialect of Shire had largely lost the formal form.

Klingon 
The Klingon language does not have a T-V distinction, with the second-person pronouns SoH (singular) and tlhIH (plural) and their appropriate conjugating verb prefixes covering all forms of address. However, Klingon does employ a number of honorifics, such as qaH (Sir or Madam) or joHwI'  (my lord or my lady) to express formality. An honorific verb suffix -neS exists, used to express extreme politeness or deference towards a superior in a social or military hierarchy. It is rarely employed and never required.

References

Etiquette
Personal pronouns
Language comparison
Sociolinguistics